Roderick Jefferson Gonçalves Miranda  (born 30 March 1991), known as Roderick, is a Portuguese professional footballer who plays as a centre-back for Melbourne Victory in the A-League Men.

Having started his professional career at Benfica, he made 103 Primeira Liga appearances mainly for Rio Ave as well as Famalicão. He also played in Switzerland, Spain, England, Greece, Turkey and Australia.

Club career

Benfica
Born in Odivelas, Roderick arrived in Benfica's youth academy in 2000 (aged nine), from Lisbon neighbours Odivelas. He was promoted to the first team nine years later after having played in all the youth ranks, and made his debut on 17 December 2009 in a dead rubber game in the group stage of the UEFA Europa League, featuring for the full 90 minutes of a 2–1 home win against AEK Athens. His only other appearance was on 13 January, in a 1–1 away draw with Vitória de Guimarães in the Taça da Liga round-robin.

Roderick played his first game in the Primeira Liga on 7 November 2010, as a 73rd-minute substitute for Carlos Martins in a 5–0 loss at Porto in O Clássico. For 2011–12, he was loaned to Servette in Switzerland – coached by former Benfica player João Alves – in a season-long move.

On 31 July 2012, Roderick joined Deportivo de La Coruña of La Liga, also on loan for a season. He made four appearances, starting with a 1–1 draw at Athletic Bilbao in which he requested his substitution through injury; he returned to the Estádio da Luz in the following transfer window.

In one of only two league matches in the 2012–13 campaign, Roderick came on away to Porto in the penultimate round of fixtures, with both teams competing for the title; he was marking Kelvin, who scored the added-time winner. He said years later that manager Jorge Jesus did not blame him for the defeat.

Rio Ave
Roderick was released by Benfica in August 2013, signing a five-year deal with Rio Ave. In January 2015, he suffered an Achilles tendon injury against Gil Vicente, and was ruled out for the rest of the season.

On 18 March 2016, nearing his 25th birthday, Roderick scored his first senior goal, a header that was the only one in a home game with Marítimo. He netted three times in 33 games in the following campaign, helping to a seventh-place finish.

Wolverhampton Wanderers
On 13 June 2017, Roderick joined English Championship team Wolverhampton Wanderers on a four-year contract for an undisclosed fee. He made his debut on 5 August, playing the whole of a 1–0 home victory over Middlesbrough.

Roderick continued in the league team for 14 matches, before falling out of favour with manager Nuno Espírito Santo. He finished the season with 19 appearances in all competitions, as Wolves were promoted as champions.

On 11 July 2018, Roderick joined Super League Greece club Olympiacos on a season-long loan. On 1 September 2019, he moved to Famalicão, newly promoted to the Portuguese top division, again on loan. He played regularly as the team finished sixth, scoring two goals, and was sent off in the 34th minute of a 2–2 draw at nearby Braga on 3 November for a foul on Galeno.

Later career
On 1 February 2021, shortly after agreeing to part ways with Wolverhampton, Roderick moved to Gaziantep of the Turkish Süper Lig on a five-month deal. On 1 October, he agreed to a two-year contract at Melbourne Victory.

International career
Of Brazilian descent through his parents, Roderick chose to represent Portugal internationally and went on to win 45 caps at youth level. He represented the under-20 team that finished as runners-up at the 2011 FIFA World Cup in Colombia, often partnering Sporting CP's Nuno Reis.

Career statistics

Honours
Benfica
Taça da Liga: 2009–10, 2010–11
UEFA Europa League runner-up: 2012–13

Rio Ave
Taça de Portugal runner-up: 2013–14
Taça da Liga runner-up: 2013–14
Supertaça Cândido de Oliveira runner-up: 2014

Wolverhampton Wanderers
EFL Championship: 2017–18

Portugal U20
FIFA U-20 World Cup runner-up: 2011

Individual
A-Leagues All Star: 2022

Orders
 Knight of the Order of Prince Henry

References

External links

National team data 

1991 births
Living people
People from Odivelas
Portuguese people of Brazilian descent
Sportspeople from Lisbon District
Portuguese footballers
Association football defenders
Primeira Liga players
Liga Portugal 2 players
Odivelas F.C. players
S.L. Benfica footballers
S.L. Benfica B players
Rio Ave F.C. players
F.C. Famalicão players
Swiss Super League players
Servette FC players
La Liga players
Deportivo de La Coruña players
English Football League players
Wolverhampton Wanderers F.C. players
Super League Greece players
Olympiacos F.C. players
Süper Lig players
Gaziantep F.K. footballers
A-League Men players
Melbourne Victory FC players
Portugal youth international footballers
Portuguese expatriate footballers
Expatriate footballers in Switzerland
Expatriate footballers in Spain
Expatriate footballers in England
Expatriate footballers in Greece
Expatriate footballers in Turkey
Expatriate soccer players in Australia
Portuguese expatriate sportspeople in Switzerland
Portuguese expatriate sportspeople in Spain
Portuguese expatriate sportspeople in England
Portuguese expatriate sportspeople in Greece
Portuguese expatriate sportspeople in Turkey
Portuguese expatriate sportspeople in Australia